Depth & Current is a noise pop, shoegazing band from Seattle, Washington.

Reviews
Depth & Current have released a CD EP, a 7" single, and a full-length CD on Norman, Oklahoma-based independent label Nice People.  Their music has been described by Magnet (magazine) as "vast and dynamic as an ocean, characterized by guttural vocals and mesmerizing, spacious psychedelic guitar riffs loaded with distortion". The Norman Transcript called their music "a sound of foreboding doom and forbidden enchantment". The Oklahoma Gazette said that their debut album "sucks and swirls heavy, noisy mixes of grungy guitar and shoegazey vocals into the same dark hinterland where Albini and My Bloody Valentine get plastered and swap dirty jokes".

Band members
 Chris Harris
 Derek Lemke

Discography

Albums
Arms EP - Nice People, 2009
Self-Titled - Nice People, 2011
"Transient" - Club AC30, March 25, 2013
"Dysrhythmia" - Nice People, June 24, 2014
"Believe" - Nice People, February 24, 2015

Singles
"Don't Go Away" - Nice People, 2010
"Make It Home" - Little Mafia, 2013

Other appearances
 The song "Lost" from their self-titled debut album was featured on the second volume of the 200,000 Gazes Compilation released digitally by the When The Sun Hits Blog in March 2012.
 The song "Someone" from their self-titled debut album was featured on the 2012 Summer Sampler from Virginia Beach-based shoegaze label, Custom Made Music.

References

External links
Official Website
Depth & Current on Facebook
Depth & Current on YouTube
Nice People Official Website
Club AC30 Official Website

Indie rock musical groups from Washington (state)
Musical groups from Seattle